Blomefield is a surname. Notable people with the surname include:

Francis Blomefield (1705–1752), English antiquary
Leonard Blomefield (1800–1893), English clergyman
Thomas Blomefield (1744–1822), British Army colonel-commandant

See also
Blomefield baronets
Blomfield (surname)